Ian McCrae (born 31 October 1943) is  a former Australian rules footballer who played with Fitzroy in the Victorian Football League (VFL).

Football
On 6 July 1963, playing as second rover (resting in the forward-pocket), and kicking one goal, he was a member of the young and inexperienced Fitzroy team that comprehensively and unexpectedly defeated Geelong, 9.13 (67) to 3.13 (31) in the 1963 Miracle Match.

See also
 1963 Miracle Match

Notes

References

External links 
 		
 

Living people
1943 births
Australian rules footballers from Victoria (Australia)
Fitzroy Football Club players